Simon Vai Stepaniak (born May 15, 1997) is a former American football offensive guard. He played college football at Indiana.

College career
A three-star recruit, Stepaniak committed to Indiana over offers from Louisville, Kentucky, Minnesota, Penn State, and Wake Forest, among others. In his first two seasons, he played behind Dan Feeney. As a senior, Stepaniak started 10 games at right guard and one game at left guard. He earned third-team all-Big Ten honors. According to Pro Football Focus, he gave up one sack as a senior. Stepaniak made 31 career starts at Indiana.

Professional career

Stepaniak was selected by the Green Bay Packers in the sixth round with the 209th pick of the 2020 NFL Draft. He was the Packers' third straight offensive line selection. He was signed on June 1, 2020. He was placed on the active/non-football injury list at the start of training camp on July 31, 2020. He was moved to the reserve/non-football injury list at the start of the regular season on September 5, 2020. He was activated on December 9, 2020. On January 12, 2021, Stepaniak was placed on injured reserve. He was placed on the reserve/retired list on July 31, 2021.

References

External links

Green Bay Packers bio

1997 births
Living people
Players of American football from Cincinnati
American football offensive tackles
Indiana Hoosiers football players
Green Bay Packers players